The name Prapiroon has been used to name four tropical cyclones in the northwestern Pacific Ocean. The name was submitted by the Kingdom of Thailand and is the name of a Thai rain god.
 Typhoon Prapiroon (2000) (T0012, 20W, Lusing) – affected the Ryukyu Islands and Korean Peninsula
 Typhoon Prapiroon (2006) (T0606, 07W, Henry) – affected China
 Typhoon Prapiroon (2012) (T1221, 22W, Nina)
 Typhoon Prapiroon (2018) (T1807, 09W, Florita)

Pacific typhoon set index articles